The 2016 Radivoj Korać Cup season was the 10th season of the Serbian national basketball cup tournament.

The competition started on February 18 and concluded with the Final on February 21, 2016.

Venue

Teams
Eight teams competed in this years cup.

Bracket

Quarterfinals

Semifinals

Final

External links
 Basketball Federation of Serbia 

2014
Radivoj
Serbia